The Escuela Médico Militar is a medical school of the Mexican army and air force for advanced medical training.  The school is located in Mexico City.

The school was founded as Escuela Constitucionalista Médico Militar by Generals Guadalupe Gracia García-Cumplido and Enrique Cornelio Osornio Martínez de los Ríos in 1917. It is deemed to be the follow-on institution of the Escuela Práctica Médico-Militar which was founded for practical training of
military physicians at the San Lucas military hospital in Mexico City by its first director Francisco Montes de Oca y Saucedo in 1880.

The Escuela Médico Militar is under the command of the general direction of military education and rectorate of the university of the army and the air force, a department of the Secretaría de la Defensa Nacional (SEDENA) called Dirección General de Educación Militar y Rectoría de la Universidad del Ejército y Fuerza Aérea Mexicanos (UDEFA).

Professors of the Escuela Médico Militar 
 Guadalupe Gracia García-Cumplido, also founder and director
 Enrique Cornelio Osornio Martínez de los Ríos, also founder and director
 Fernando Ocaranza Carmona
 Edmundo Calva Cuadrilla 
 Segismundo Rodríguez Rodríguez
 Martha Patricia Fernandez

External links 
 Escuela Médico Militar, SEDENA
 aerial photo at Wikimapia

References 

Medical schools in Mexico
Military schools
Military medical installations
Military education and training in Mexico
Escuela Médico Militar
Educational institutions established in 1917
1917 establishments in Mexico